John Findlay, also known as Jack Findlay or Jock Findlay (died 25 September 1916), was a Scottish professional footballer who played in the Scottish League for Vale of Leven and Airdrieonians as a right half. He also played in the Football League for Newcastle United.

Personal life 
After the outbreak of the First World War, Findlay enlisted as a private in the Scots Guards in Girvan and died of wounds in France on 25 September 1916. He was buried in Bienvillers Military Cemetery.

Career statistics

References

Year of birth missing
1916 deaths
Footballers from East Ayrshire
Scottish footballers
English Football League players
Association football midfielders
Newcastle United F.C. players
Vale of Leven F.C. players
British Army personnel of World War I
Scots Guards soldiers
British military personnel killed in World War I
Airdrieonians F.C. (1878) players
Scottish Football League players